India Quarterly is a peer reviewed journal. It functions as a forum for discussion on matters concerning international relations and national foreign policies. It is published quarterly by SAGE Publications in association with Indian Council of World Affairs.

This journal is a member of the Committee on Publication Ethics (COPE).

Abstracting and indexing 
India Quarterly is abstracted and indexed in:
 Research Papers in Economics 
 DeepDyve
 Portico
 Dutch-KB
 OCLC
 ICI
 EBSCO: Australia/New Zealand Reference Centre
 ProQuest: Worldwide Political Science Abstracts
 ProQuest: Political Affairs Information Service
 Thomson Reuters: Emerging Sources Citation Index (ESCI)
 Scopus
 J-Gate

References
 http://www.icwa.in/ 
 http://publicationethics.org/members/india-quarterly-journal-international-affairs

External links
 
 Homepage

SAGE Publishing academic journals
International relations
Political science
Publications established in 1954